The 1932 Mecklenburg-Strelitz state election was held on 13 March 1932 to elect the 35 members of the Landtag of the Free State of Mecklenburg-Strelitz.

Results

References 

Mecklenburg-Strelitz
Elections in Mecklenburg-Western Pomerania